"We Can Only Live Today (Puppy)" is a song by Belgian drum and bass producer Netsky, featuring vocals from Billie. The song was released on November 5, 2012, as a digital download in the United Kingdom. It appears on the deluxe edition of his second album 2. The song was written by Boris Daenen and Billie Bentein. It is the vocal version of the instrumental track "Puppy" from the standard edition of his album. It has peaked at number 8 in Belgium. A physical 10" vinyl was released for Record Store Day 2013.

Music video
A music video to accompany the release of "We Can Only Live Today (Puppy)" was first released onto YouTube on October 31, 2012, at a total length of three minutes and thirty-nine seconds. The video was directed by Andrew Attah and shot by Nezih Savaşkan. The video was filmed in Mid Wales.

Track listings

Chart performance

Release history

References

2012 singles
Netsky (musician) songs
2012 songs
Hospital Records singles